Celerina  is an Ancient city, former bishopric and present Latin Catholic titular see in North Africa.

It's presumably located near Guebeur-Bou-Aoun, in modern Algeria.

History 
The city was important enough in the Roman province of Numidia to become a suffragan bishopric of the capital's Metropolitan Archbishop. However it faded, presumably under Islam.

Titular see 
The diocese was nominally restored in 1933 as a titular bishopric.

It has had the following incumbents, all of the lowest (episcopal) rank :
 Georges-Louis Mercier, White Fathers (M. Afr.) (1948.06.21 – 1955.09.14)
 Luís Victor Sartori (1956.01.10 – 1960.09.14)
 Karl Gnädinger (1960.11.05 – 1995.03.12)
 Marko Sopi (1995.11.02 – 2006.01.11)
 Athanasius Schneider, Crosier Canons (O.R.C.) (2006.04.08 – ...), Auxiliary Bishop of Mary Most Holy in Astana (Kazakhstan)

See also 
 Catholic Church in Algeria

References

External links 
 GigaCatholic, with incumbent biography links

Catholic titular sees in Africa
Former Roman Catholic dioceses in Africa